Ieuan Gethin ap Ieuan ap Lleision (fl. c. 1450) was a Welsh language poet, of Baglan, Glamorgan.

References  

Welsh-language poets
15th-century Welsh poets